Idéal Sportif de Tighennif, known as IS Tighennif or simply IST for short, is an Algerian football club based in Tighennif in Mascara Province. The club was founded in 1945 and its colours are black and white. Their home stadium, Stade Hassaine Lakehal, has a capacity of 5,000 spectators. The club is currently playing in the Inter-Régions Division.

History 
The first foundation of the team was in the thirties by the colonizer then the Muslims entered it, so I reformed the team and officially created it in the year 1945 under the name by Ideal Sports musulimans De Palikao.

The Algerian League participated in the second division, then it fell to the amateur section and then to the inter-league section in 2015.

the Idéal Sportif de Tighennif (IS Tighennif) founded in 1945 by musulmans.

References

External links

Football clubs in Algeria
Mascara Province
Association football clubs established in 1945
1945 establishments in Algeria
Sports clubs in Algeria